Radom is a village in Washington County, Illinois, United States. The population was 220 at the 2010 census.

History
Radom was originally settled chiefly by Poles. The city takes its name after Radom, in Poland.

Geography
Radom is located at  (38.281435, -89.194128).

Demographics

As of the census of 2000, there were 395 people, 86 households, and 58 families residing in the village. The racial makeup of the village was 97.72% White, 1.77% African American, 0.25% from other races, and 0.25% from two or more races. Hispanic or Latino of any race were 0.76% of the population.

There were 86 households, out of which 36.0% had children under the age of 18 living with them, 58.1% were married couples living together, 9.3% had a female householder with no husband present, and 31.4% were non-families. 29.1% of all households were made up of individuals, and 22.1% had someone living alone who was 65 years of age or older. The average household size was 2.58 and the average family size was 3.19.

In the village, the population was spread out, with 16.2% under the age of 18, 2.3% from 18 to 24, 18.2% from 25 to 44, 13.2% from 45 to 64, and 50.1% who were 65 years of age or older. The median age was 65 years. For every 100 females, there were 77.9 males. For every 100 females age 18 and over, there were 68.9 males.

The median income for a household in the village was $30,000, and the median income for a family was $44,375. Males had a median income of $36,250 versus $25,000 for females. The per capita income for the village was $13,882. About 5.8% of families and 8.3% of the population were below the poverty line, including 2.9% of those under age 18 and 16.0% of those age 65 or over.

See also
 Radom (disambiguation)

Footnotes

Villages in Washington County, Illinois
Villages in Illinois
Polish-American culture in Illinois